Scott Brown (born 7 May 1971) is an Australian former rugby league footballer who played for the Cronulla-Sutherland Sharks and North Queensland Cowboys in the 1990s. He primarily played .

Playing career
In 1989 and 1990, he played for the Ipswich Jets in the Winfield State League.

In 1996, after not playing a first grade game for Cronulla in 1995, Brown joined the North Queensland Cowboys.

References

1971 births
Living people
Australian rugby league players
Cronulla-Sutherland Sharks players
North Queensland Cowboys players
Ipswich Jets players
Rugby league five-eighths
Rugby league players from Sydney